Millville's First Bank Building is located in Millville, Cumberland County, New Jersey, United States. The building was built in 1857 and was added to the National Register of Historic Places on November 20, 1980.

See also
National Register of Historic Places listings in Cumberland County, New Jersey

References

Buildings and structures in Cumberland County, New Jersey
Commercial buildings on the National Register of Historic Places in New Jersey
Commercial buildings completed in 1857
Italianate architecture in New Jersey
Millville, New Jersey
National Register of Historic Places in Cumberland County, New Jersey
New Jersey Register of Historic Places
1857 establishments in New Jersey